The US-ASEAN Business Council (also known as "US-ABC" or "USABC") is an advocacy group that aims to foster economic growth and trade ties between the United States and the Association of Southeast Asian Nations (ASEAN)'s ten member countries. It is the only U.S.-based organization enshrined in the ASEAN charter. Headquartered in Washington, DC, the Council has offices in New York City, Indonesia, Malaysia, Philippines, Singapore, Thailand, Vietnam, and Myanmar. The Council represents more than 170 of the largest US corporations.

History
The Council was created in response to a request from the ASEAN governments at the ASEAN-US dialogue of 1984. First known as the "US-ASEAN Center for Technology Exchange," the Council's mission was to enhance trade and investment opportunities for US companies in ASEAN, and to increase the ASEAN countries' access to US sources of technology and training. President Ronald Reagan remarked on the Council's founding, "You are embarking on a most important and innovative private sector initiative to strengthen the United States presence and our competitiveness in Southeast Asia." In 1989, The US-ASEAN Center for Technology Exchange absorbed the ASEAN-US Business Council that had been housed in the United States Chamber of Commerce since 1979. Following the merger, the Council took the name of the US-ASEAN Council for Business and Technology. The name was formally changed to US-ASEAN Business Council in 1997. Since the Council's founding in 1984, there has been remarkable growth in trade between the United States and ASEAN, reaching US$198.5 billion in 2012.

Industry committees
The Council's working group committees include all ten ASEAN nations, as well as industry portfolios: Customs & Trade Facilitation, Defense & Security, Energy, Financial Services, Food & Agriculture, Health and Life Sciences, Information & Communications Technology, Infrastructure, Manufacturing, and Travel & Tourism. Through these committees, the Council works to solve problems and facilitate opportunities in varying market conditions. Its Financial Service Committee, for instance, is a participant of the annual ASEAN Finance Ministers' and Central Bank Governors' Meeting (AFMGM), thus giving the Council the capacity to raise and advocate member company concerns. The Council's Energy Committee, currently chaired by Chevron, represents specific industries ranging from geothermal, coal based methane and wind energy to oil & gas, natural resources and nuclear energy.

Programs and events
The Council conducts several programs and events to promote mutual dialogue between US businesses and leading political figures of Southeast Asia. Programs include ASEAN Trade/Economic Ministers' and Ambassadors' Roadshows; annual Business Missions to  Brunei, Cambodia, Indonesia, Laos, Malaysia, Myanmar, Philippines, Singapore, Thailand and Vietnam; presenting of the Council's Lifetime Achievement Award to Singapore's Minister Mentor and First Prime Minister Lee Kuan Yew; and dinner galas hosted in honour of foreign dignitaries, including former Myanmar President Thein Sein, President of the Philippines Benigno Aquino III, Malaysian Prime Minister Najib Razak and Vietnamese President Truong Tan Sang on each of their visits to the United States.

Membership
The Council membership includes over 160 leading US corporations across several business sectors. Members engage at either the Corporate or Chairman's Council level. Previous Chairs of the Council include Keith Williams, Chairman and CEO of UL LLC, Maurice Greenberg, Chairman and CEO of C.V. Starr and Co., Inc, Muhtar Kent, Chairman and CEO of The Coca-Cola Company, Roderick Hills, Chairman of Hills Companies and Charles Williamson, Chairman and CEO of Unocal Corporation.

US-ASEAN Business Council Institute
A sister organisation of the Council, The US-ASEAN Business Council Institute is a 501(c)(3) charitable organisation primarily focused on humanitarian activities and community engagement. US-ASEAN Business Council Institute initiatives aim to improve the lives of people in Southeast Asia, and to provide support for programs that preserve and expand knowledge about the rich cultural and art heritage of the ASEAN region. Additionally, the Institute works on initiatives related to education, governance and rule of law, health, and the environment.

References

External links 

 News coverage on the US-ASEAN Business Council Myanmar Business Mission Delegation meeting Myanmar President Thein Sein
 US-ASEAN Business Council Lobby Indonesia on Trans Pacific Partnership
 US-ASEAN Business Council Supports Southeast Asia: Coverage in ASEAN Business News
 US-ASEAN Business Council vows to continue long-term business partnership with Myanmar
 Remarks by Robert Hormats, Under Secretary for Economic Growth, Energy, and the Environment at the U.S Embassy, Rangoon
 ASEAN Economic Ministers Engage with U.S Businesses

Organizations associated with ASEAN
Organizations established in 1984